Mogacho Anvddo is a 1950 Indian Konkani-language film. It was the first film in Konkani and was produced and directed by Al Jerry Braganza (Antonio Lawrence Jerry Braganza), a native of Mapusa, under the banner ETICA pictures (Exchange Talkies of India, China and Africa). It was released on 24 April 1950. Hence, this day is celebrated as Konkani Cinema Day, and Al Jerry Braganza is called the 'Father of Konkani cinema'.

Plot
A story of love between a rich spoiled boy and a poor girl.

Cast
 Irene Amara
 Al Jerry Braganza
 Elizabeth D'Abreo
 Mary D'Souza
 Jacob Fernandes
 Joyce Fernandes
 Leena Fernandes
 Romeo Paul Pires
 Lewis Ratus

See also
 Konkani cinema
 Nirmon

References

External links
 
 Photos of Mogacho Anvddo and Konkani cinema

Konkani-language films
1950 films
Indian romance films
1950s romance films
Indian black-and-white films